Nike Lorenz (born 12 March 1997) is a German field hockey player. She represented her country at the 2016 Summer Olympics. In December 2019, she was nominated for the FIH Rising Star of the Year Award.

References

External links

1997 births
Living people
German female field hockey players
Field hockey players at the 2016 Summer Olympics
Field hockey players at the 2020 Summer Olympics
Olympic field hockey players of Germany
Field hockey players from Berlin
Olympic bronze medalists for Germany
Olympic medalists in field hockey
Medalists at the 2016 Summer Olympics
Female field hockey defenders
Mannheimer HC players
21st-century German women

2018 FIH Indoor Hockey World Cup players